The 2015 European Athletics Indoor Championships were held from 5 to 8 March 2015 in the O2 Arena in Prague, Czech Republic.

Bidding process
Prague was chosen as the host of the Championships on the European Athletics council meeting in Sofia, Bulgaria in May 2012. The other candidate city was Istanbul, Turkey. Previously, Prague hosted the 1967 European Indoor Games, the forerunner of the European Athletics Indoor Championships. It was the first time since the 1978 European Athletics Championships that Prague hosted a major athletics championships.

International athletics events in the Czech Republic traditionally took place away from Prague at the outdoor arena in Ostrava. That city's annual Golden Spike Ostrava meet began in 1961, and the 2011 European Athletics U23 Championships and 2007 World Youth Championships in Athletics were held in the preceding years. However, the annual Josef Odložil Memorial outdoor meeting in Prague has attracted international athletes since 1994.

Preparation
Prior to the event, the O2 Arena in Prague was not a regular venue for indoor track and field. The stadium was host to the one-off "Meeting of World Record Holders" in 2009, which was the first international non-championship indoor meeting to be staged in the capital. A year before the championships, the Prague Indoor Meeting was staged as a test event and it received European Athletics permit status. This attracted top level performers and highlights included a European indoor record by high jumper Ivan Ukhov and a European indoor best for the 500 metres by home athlete Pavel Maslák.

Maslák, the 400 m champion from the 2013 European Athletics Indoor Championships, led the Czech team for the championships, which at 46 athletes was the country's largest squad ever for the competition. Libor Varhaník, chairman of the organising committee, specifically aimed to have as many Czech athletes compete in the events as possible in order to build local interest and boost ticket sales. The opening ceremony was held on 5 March – a day before the main competition began on Friday (although shot put and men's long jump qualifying was held that evening). Former international high jumper and European indoor medallist Tomáš Janků was appointed as CEO and committee member of the organising group.

The event was televised live, with a total of 28 international broadcasters having agreements to show the proceedings either live or delayed. Eurosport was the most prominent of these in the competition's region, continuing its place as the traditional main broadcaster. A live internet feed of the event was also available on the European Athletics website. Retail chain Spar was the principal sponsor, reflecting the fact that it is the main commercial sponsor for the governing body. The event also had a dedicated social media presence in the form of a Facebook page and a Twitter feed (@praha2015), as well as an official website.

The competition logo incorporated a stylised version of the skyline of Hradčany – the district around Prague Castle and historical seat of government. The official mascot of the competition was the Little Mole (Krtek), the protagonist of a popular Czech cartoon series.

As the only major international indoor athletics event to be staged that year, the European Athletics Indoor Permit Meetings and (almost exclusively European-based) IAAF Indoor Permit Meetings served as the competitive build up for the event. In the absence of official qualifying standards, team selection was partially based on performances at national championships for some of the larger European nations.

Men's results

Track

Field

Combined

Women's results

Track

Field

Combined

Medal table

Placing table
Points were awarded for every place in the top eight of each event: 8 for 1st, 7 for 2nd, 6 for 3rd, etc.

Records

Participating nations

  (2)
  (2)
  (2)
  (7)
  (2)
  (15)
  (12)
  (3)
  (13)
  (3)
  (6)
  (45) (Host)
  (12)
  (8)
  (7)
  (26)
  (4)
  (39)
  (1)
  (35)
  (11) 
  (11)
  (5)
  (12)
  (4)
  (22)
  (11)
  (6)
  (4)
  (2)
  (2)
  (2)
  (1)
  (2)
  (17)
  (12)
  (42)
  (7)
  (16)
  (41)
  (1)
  (6)
  (27)
  (12)
  (30)
  (24)
  (7)
  (10)
  (23)

References

External links

Official website
EAA competition website

 
European Athletics Indoor Championships
International athletics competitions hosted by the Czech Republic
European Athletics Indoor Championships
European Athletics Indoor Championships
Sports competitions in Prague
European Athletics Indoor Championships
European Athletics Indoor Championships
March 2015 sports events in Europe